Heaven's Venom  is the tenth studio album by Canadian death metal band Kataklysm. It was released on August 13, 2010 (Europe) and August 24, 2010 (America) through Nuclear Blast.

Track listing

Personnel
Kataklysm
 Maurizio Iacono - Vocals
 Jean-François Dagenais - Guitars
 Stéphane Barbe - Bass
 Max Duhamel - Drums

Production
 Katja Michaelsen - Photography
 Tue Madsen - Mastering, Mixing
 John Huff - Cover Art, Layout
 Jean-François Dagenais - Engineering, Producer

Chart performance

References

2010 albums
Kataklysm albums
Nuclear Blast albums